Miyan taushe is a soup made from pumpkin, it is commonly eaten by Hausa tribe in the northern part of Nigeria. The soup is mostly prepared with yakuwa leaf, dawadawa (locust beans), crayfish, meat, onions, and spices.

It is native and popular with the Hausa and Fulani tribes of northern Nigeria. It is eaten with the necessary starch (tuwon shinkafa, tuwon masara, tuwon alkama, fufu, rice, naan, and other northern Nigerian dishes). These starches are usually made from high-starch carbohydrates like rice, yams, cassavas/yoca, plantains and many others which are collectively given the term "fufu", "okele", or swallow. because of how these foods used to be eaten by wrapping a small piece of the starch ball in soup using the hands and swallowing with minimal chewing.

See also 
Hausa cuisine
Nigerian cuisine
Tuwon shinkafa

References 

Hausa cuisine
Nigerian soups
Squash and pumpkin dishes